Eddie Carl Brown (born November 26, 1940) is an American investment manager, entrepreneur and philanthropist. Renowned for his stock-picking acumen, Brown is the founder and president of Brown Capital Management, a Baltimore-based firm that's amassed more than $10 billion under management since it opened for business in 1983. An avid traveler and jazz aficionado, Brown and his wife, Sylvia, have given millions to various charitable causes under the aegis of the Baltimore-based Eddie C. and C. Sylvia Brown Family Foundation.

Early life 

Brown was born to 13-year-old Annie Mae Brown in Apopka, Florida, a rural hamlet in the central part of the state where agriculture dominated the local economy and Jim Crow laws kept blacks and whites rigidly ensconced in their separate, unequal, worlds.   Brown’s mother left town when she was 15.  From that point forward, Brown’s grandparents Jake and Mamie Brown Sr. and his uncle, Jake Brown Jr. – took over his socialization. Brown’s proclivity for academic excellence first manifested itself in elementary school, prompting his grandmother to pay for a typewriter and typing lessons for her grandson. She was determined to have him avoid performing manual labor in the Apopka citrus groves that supported his grandparents.  To this day, Brown still types proficiently enough to dash out 60 error-free words per minute.

When Brown was six, his entrepreneurial Uncle Jake taught him how to drive a flatbed truck, enabling fruit pickers to load boxes of oranges, grapefruit, and tangerines in Apopka’s citrus groves. Jake also ran a thriving moonshine enterprise in central Florida and under his tutelage, Brown was piloting hotrods filled with white lightning by the time he was 11. A disapproving relative quietly contacted Brown’s mother, who snatched her son out of Apopka and relocated him to Allentown, Pennsylvania. Brown attended an integrated high school in Allentown where he continued to be a top academic performer. He graduated with honors from Allentown High School, one of five African Americans out of a class of 760 students.

Still Brown had no realistic prospect of attending college, until a white Allentown woman who owned a casket making business offered to subsidize his higher education. Brown never met his benefactor, whose offer was made through a proxy.  One of his lifelong regrets is never having thanked her face-to-face.  But her legacy lives on because her kindness triggered in Brown a passionate interest in philanthropy. His benefactor’s largesse allowed Brown to earn a B.S. in electrical engineering in 1961, which he received from Howard University, in Washington, D.C.

Career 

After graduating from Howard, Brown worked for a few months with defense contractor Martin Marietta in Orlando, Florida, where he did quality control work on Titan Intercontinental ballistic missiles. That ended after Brown was called into Army service as a lieutenant at Ft. Monmouth County, New Jersey, to satisfy a military obligation Brown incurred when he joined the Army Reserve Officers’ Training Corps program at Howard University.  Following two years on active duty as a Signal Corps officer, Brown joined IBM’s Systems Development Division in Poughkeepsie, New York. Brown spent five years designing computer circuits for large mainframe computers while employed by IBM, and also earned a master’s degree in electrical engineering from New York University.

During his time at IBM Brown became increasingly fascinated with finance and investing, so he opted to take advantage of an IBM management development program that allowed him to earn an MBA degree from Indiana University in 1970.  Eager to learn everything he could about wealth creation and use it for his family’s benefit, Brown joined Irwin Management Co., in Columbus, Indiana, eventually becoming a member of the money management firm’s marketable securities group. In 1973 Brown moved to Baltimore to take a position as a portfolio manager with investment firm T. Rowe Price. A decade later Brown left to start Brown Capital Management, which initially operated out of his suburban Baltimore home. A valuation-conscious investor, Brown put his  company’s focus on stocks offering growth-at-a-reasonable-price, or GARP.  Brown Capital Management caters to high-net-worth individuals, pension and profit sharing plans, charitable organizations and corporations.

In the early years of Brown Capital Management, Brown’s ability to attract investors received a welcome boost when he became a regular panelist on the PBS financial television program Wall $treet Week with Louis Rukeyser, which was popular during the 1980s and 1990s.  “Ed is one of the most careful, and successful, students of securities alive today, and he gives us the specifics of what’s on his list,” Rukeyser noted.

Brown Capital Management celebrated its 30th year in business in 2013, occupies a three-story building at 1201 North Calvert Street in downtown Baltimore and employs 37 workers. Brown continues to find money management a compelling and invigorating exercise, and remains an active and highly engaged participant in the day-to-day operations of the company he founded.  “This is the kind of business that, if you really enjoy it, like I do, it’s not like work, it’s like fun,” Brown says.

Personal life 

Brown married his college sweetheart from Howard University, the former Sylvia Thurston, on August 11, 1962, in King William, Virginia. The Browns have two daughters and three grandsons.  Possessing a longtime interest in aviation, Brown tried to attend helicopter flight school while he was a lieutenant in the Army, but was rejected after the vision in one eye failed to pass visual acuity standards.  Years later Brown got a private pilots license for civilian fixed-wing aircraft, but stopped flying after his flights started to become too infrequent for him to remain proficient.  A golf enthusiast who is also an avid photographer, Brown is a major collector of African-American art.  Brown’s primary residence is in suburban Baltimore, and he maintains homes in Florida and Maine.

Recognition 

Brown has received an impressive number of awards and encomiums, to include the Woodrow Wilson Award for Public Service.
Brown was also Maryland Life magazine’s 2006 Maryland of Distinction, an honor former Republican Maryland Gov. Robert Ehrlich Jr., said stemmed from Brown’s “tireless dedication to improving the lives of others and making your communities better places to live.”

The founder of Brown Capital Management was also recognized in Black Enterprise magazine’s 40th Anniversary Issue in a 2010 article that ran under the headline “Titans: 40 Most Powerful African Americans in Business.”  Brown and his wife, Sylvia, were also the recipients of the 2011 Ronald H. Brown American Journey Award by the Ron Brown Scholars Program, a national college scholarship program.

Brown and his wife, C. Sylvia Brown, were jointly awarded Honorary Doctor of Humane Letters degrees from Johns Hopkins University on May 23, 2013. The degrees were bestowed during the University’s Commencement ceremony in Baltimore.

Politics 

Brown has been a stalwart supporter of Democratic Party politicians and policies over the years, to include the 2008 presidential campaign of Barack Obama.

Philanthropy 

Brown and his wife, Sylvia, have faithfully backed causes that improve inner-city Baltimore paradigms, usually through an association with health care, education, or the arts. The Browns’ contributions are typically funneled through the Eddie C. and C. Sylvia Brown Family Foundation.  One beneficiary has been the Turning the Corner Achievement Program (TCAP), which focuses on attaining improved educational and social outcomes for inner-city Baltimore youths. The Browns’ foundation has committed $5 million to TCAP since 2002.

Books and articles about Brown 
An autobiographical book about Brown titled Beating the Odds: Eddie Brown’s Investing and Life Strategies was released in May 2011 (John Wiley & Sons, 240 pages).  Brown is also the subject of an article titled “Where to Find Reasonably Priced Growth Stocks” written by Christopher C. Williams and published by Barrons on January 11, 2010.

References

External links 
 Eddie C. Brown Website
 Brown Capital Management Website 
 Johns Hopkins University: Brown Community Health Scholarship Website
Baltimore Times: Top Money Manager Eddie C. Brown speaks about his Autobiography, ‘Beating the Odds,’ at BCCC
 Eddie C. Brown of Brown Capital Management named Loyola's Business Leader of the Year 2010
2011 Marylanders of the Year, Eddie C. and S. Sylvia Brown 

1940 births
Living people
American investors
American nonprofit businesspeople
American philanthropists
Howard University alumni
African-American investors
New York University alumni
Indiana University alumni
People from Apopka, Florida
Martin Marietta people
21st-century African-American people
20th-century African-American people